Some women to have held the title Duchess of Northumberland, as wives of the Duke of Northumberland, include:
First creation
 Jane Dudley, Duchess of Northumberland (1508/9–1555), (née Guildford), wife of the duke
Third creation
 Elizabeth Percy, Duchess of Northumberland (1716–1776), (née Seymour), wife of the 1st duke
 Frances Percy, Duchess of Northumberland (1752–1820), (née Burrell), wife of the 2nd duke
 Charlotte Percy, Duchess of Northumberland (1787–1866), (née Clive), wife of the 3rd duke
 Eleanor Percy, Duchess of Northumberland (1820–1911), (née Grosvenor), wife of the 4th duke
 Helen Percy, Duchess of Northumberland (1886–1965), (née Lennox-Gordon), wife of the 8th duke
 Elizabeth Percy, Duchess of Northumberland (1922–2012), (née Montagu Douglas Scott), wife of the 10th duke
 Jane Percy, Duchess of Northumberland (born 1958), wife of the 12th duke